The Pallay Building is an historic building in northwest Portland, Oregon, in the United States. It is listed on the National Register of Historic Places.

See also
 National Register of Historic Places listings in Northwest Portland, Oregon

References

Buildings and structures in Portland, Oregon
National Register of Historic Places in Portland, Oregon
Northwest Portland, Oregon